Cacozeliana is a genus of sea snails, marine gastropod mollusks in the family Cerithiidae.

Species
Species within the genus Cacozeliana include:

 Cacozeliana furva (Watson, 1886)
 Cacozeliana fuscocapitulum (Hedley & Petterd, 1906)
 Cacozeliana granarium (Kiener, 1842)
 Cacozeliana icarus (Bayle, 1880)
 Cacozeliana variegata (Henn & Brazier, 1894)
Species brought into synonymy
 Cacozeliana granaria : synonym of Cacozeliana granarium (Kiener, 1842)

References

External links

Cerithiidae